William John Walters (31 July 1907 – 15 July 1994) was a South African athlete who competed in the 1932 Summer Olympics.

He was born in Wakkerstroom and died in Scottburgh.

In 1932 he finished fourth the 400 metres event and sixth in the 200 metres competition.

At the 1930 Empire Games he won the silver medal in the 440 yards event and the bronze medal in the 200 yards. With the South African relay team he won the bronze medal in the 4×110 yards contest as well as in the 4×440 yards event.

External links
sports-reference.com

1907 births
1994 deaths
People from Pixley ka Seme Local Municipality
White South African people
South African male sprinters
Olympic athletes of South Africa
Athletes (track and field) at the 1932 Summer Olympics
Athletes (track and field) at the 1930 British Empire Games
Commonwealth Games silver medallists for South Africa
Commonwealth Games bronze medallists for South Africa
Commonwealth Games medallists in athletics
20th-century South African people
Medallists at the 1930 British Empire Games